Leila Lopes (19 November 1959 – 3 December 2009) was a Brazilian actress, model, journalist, porn star and television presenter, known for her appearance in TV Globo telenovelas and later for entering the pornographic film industry.

Early life
Born Leila Gomes Lopes in São Leopoldo, Rio Grande do Sul, Brazil, she was the daughter of Reúcio Lopes, a teacher from Esteio, and Natália Gomes Lopes. She lived in Esteio with her parents until she became famous in 1990 when she became a journalist for the television channel Rede Globo.

She appeared twice in Playboy magazine, the first time in March 1997 and also in May 2008 after appearing in a pornographic film for the Brasileirinhas studio.
Her last work had been as a presenter of the television program, Entre 4 Paredes com Leila Lopes. She also appeared on JustTV, Calcinha Justa, and Sexprivé.

Death
Lopes was found dead in her home early on 3 December 2009. It was subsequently confirmed that she had committed suicide by ingesting rat poison. She was buried in the family vault, at Dois de Novembro Cemetery, in Esteio, state of Rio Grande do Sul.

Career

Telenovelas
1990: Pantanal as Lúcia
1991: O Guarani as Severina
1992: Despedida de Solteiro as Carol
1993: Renascer as Teacher Lu
1994: Tropicaliente as Olívia María
1996: O Rei do Gado as Suzane
1997: Malhação as Rosa 
1998: Caça Talentos as Rosinha
1999: Chiquititas as Mãe de Vivi
2000: Marcas da Paixão as Creuza

Pornographic films
2008: Pecado sem Perdão as Marlene
2009: Pecados and Tentações as Marlene
2009: Pecado Final as Marlene
2009: A Última Enterrada

Theatre
1994: Quero Voltar Pra Casa
1995: Entre Amigas
1995: Frankestein
1996: Socorro, Mamãe foi Embora
1997: A Beata Maria do Egito
1998: Paixão de Cristo
1998: Pedro Mico
1999: Terapia Sexual
2002: Em Nome do Filho
2002: Diva
2003: Despedida Muito Louca
2004: Nunca Se Sábado
2005: Em nome do Pai

References

External links
 

1959 births
2009 deaths
People from São Leopoldo
People from Rio Grande do Sul
South American actors
Brazilian television actresses
Brazilian telenovela actresses
Brazilian soap opera actresses
Brazilian pornographic film actresses
Brazilian female adult models
Brazilian journalists
Brazilian television personalities
Women pornographic film producers
Glamour models
Suicides by poison
20th-century Brazilian actresses
21st-century Brazilian actresses
20th-century journalists
2009 suicides
Suicides in Brazil